The Medal for Participation in Operation Summer '95 is a medal awarded by the Republic of Croatia for participation in Operation Summer '95. The medal was founded on April 1, 1995.

References 

Orders, decorations, and medals of Croatia